Lasianthus tomentosus is a species of plant in the genus Lasianthus within the family Rubiaceae. It is found in Thailand, Java, Sulawesi and New Guinea. It is possibly threatened by habitat loss. Its conservation status is uncertain because of the difficulty of identifying it. Several botanical works have mistakenly described Lasianthus trichophlebus, var. latifolius as Lasianthus tomentosus.

References

External links
 Revision of Malesian Lasianthus

tomentosus
Endangered plants
Taxonomy articles created by Polbot